Carly May Leeson (born 9 November 1998) is an Australian cricketer who plays for the ACT Meteors in the Women's National Cricket League (WNCL) and the Melbourne Renegades in the Women's Big Bash League (WBBL). An all-rounder, she bats right-handed and bowls right-arm medium pace. She has previously played for the Sydney Sixers and the New South Wales Breakers.

Early life
Leeson was born on 9 November 1998 in Grafton, New South Wales. She represented New South Wales at under-15 and under-18 level and was a member of Australia's second-string Shooting Stars squad when they toured Sri Lanka in 2015.

Club career
In February 2018, Leeson became the first woman to play in a men's grade cricket match for Randwick Petersham Cricket Club.

Domestic career

Women's Big Bash League

Leeson joined the Sydney Sixers ahead of the 2016–17 WBBL season. She played one match, against the Melbourne Renegades, and took two wickets for 11 runs from her two overs.

Leeson joined the Melbourne Renegades for the 2019–20 season. Her 2020–21 season was her most successful WBBL as she took 11 wickets and made her T20 high score of 31*.

Women's National Cricket League
In the WNCL, Leeson joined the New South Wales Breakers ahead of the 2017–18 season, but did not play a match before joining the ACT Meteors in 2019.

On 23 January 2020, Leeson made her maiden one-day fifty, scoring 56 off 63 balls in a seven-wicket loss to the Breakers.

References

External links

Carly Leeson at Cricket Australia

1998 births
Living people
People from Grafton, New South Wales
Cricketers from New South Wales
Australian women cricketers
ACT Meteors cricketers
Melbourne Renegades (WBBL) cricketers
New South Wales Breakers cricketers
Sydney Sixers (WBBL) cricketers